Evelyn Maude Blanche Paul (1883 – 1963) was an artist best known for her book illustrations, including those replicating the style of medieval illuminations. Her work shows a variety of influences including Gothic, Art Nouveau and Arts and Crafts. Most significantly, the Pre-Raphaelite artist Dante Gabriel Rossetti has been identified as one of Paul's major influences.

Biography
Paul was born on 4 November 1883, at 30 Torriano Avenue, Kentish Town, in North London. Her father was the portraitist Robert Boyd Paul (1819–1903), and her mother was Annie née McGlashan (born 1858 at Gibraltar), the daughter of a sergeant in the Royal Artillery and Robert Paul's 2nd wife.
In her teens, Evelyn attended art school in London and in 1906 entered the Schools of Art National Competition. She continued her studies, and on 1 June 1911 married the artist Alexander George Small (1875-1923), son of William Small (1843-1929), a well-known painter and honorary Fellow of the Royal Scottish Academy.

Alexander died twelve years later in 1923 at St Pancras Hospital, London, at the age of 48. Evelyn died of broncho-pneumonia at the same hospital on 29 January 1963.

Selected works
 Stories from Dante (1911);
 Myths & Legends of Japan (1912);
 The Romance of Tristram of Lyones and La beale Isoude (1913);
 Dante's La Vita Nuova (1916);
 Aucassin & Nicolete (1917); and
 Clair de Lune and Other Troubadour Romances (1921).

Gallery

References

GRO birth, marriage and death certificates:
1891 Census: RG12/Piece 140/Folio 73/ Page 28.
1901 Census: RG13/Piece 171/Folio 30/ Page: 9.
1911 Census: RG14 PN712 RG78 PN25 RD9 SD3 ED2 SN218 (for Evelyn).
1911 Census: RG14 PN712 RG78 PN25 RD9 SD3 ED2 SN119 (for Alexander Small).

External links
This website  gives brief details of her life, and a photographic portrait.
Illuminated Books.com
 

Artists from London
1883 births
1963 deaths
English illustrators
People from Kentish Town
20th-century English painters